Przemysław Janusz Wipler (born 15 July 1978 in Piekary Śląskie) is a Polish politician and activist. He is a former vice-president of the Polish party Wolność. He describes himself as a Classical liberal / Korwinist Republican, in favour of Laissez-faire capitalism. He was a member of the Polish parliament in the lower chamber, the Sejm.

References 

1978 births
Living people
People from Piekary Śląskie
Members of the Polish Sejm 2011–2015